Blondie's Blessed Event is a 1942 American comedy film directed by Frank R. Strayer and starring Penny Singleton, Arthur Lake, and Larry Simms. It is the 11th of the Blondie films. It was the first to feature the character of Cookie.

Plot

Blondie gives birth to a baby daughter, Cookie, at the hospital.  Dagwood is clumsy at doing housework in her absence.  He is then sent to Chicago to attend an architects convention, where he meets an eccentric but impoverished hotel-room neighbor.  The man claims to be a playwright and mooches Dagwood's meal while writing a speech, which Dagwood then delivers at the convention.  Unfortunately, the speech urges homeowners to design their own homes rather than hire architects.  The man follows Dagwood home and takes over the running of their household, including hiring a maid, and browbeating Mr. Dithers into giving Dagwood a raise.  Blondie finally demands that he leave.

Cast
 Penny Singleton as Blondie
 Arthur Lake as Dagwood
 Larry Simms as Baby Dumpling
 Daisy as Daisy the Dog
 Jonathan Hale as J.C. Dithers
 Danny Mummert as Alvin Fuddle
 Hans Conried as George Wickley
 Stanley Brown as Ollie Shaw
 Irving Brown as Mr. Crumb
 Mary Wickes as Sarah Miller
 Norma Jean Wayne as Cookie (uncredited)

References

External links
 
 
 
 
 Rotten Tomatoes

1942 films
Columbia Pictures films
American black-and-white films
1942 comedy films
Blondie (film series) films
Films directed by Frank R. Strayer
1940s American films